Walter Sigel (12 January 1906 – 8 May 1944) was a German air officer during World War II. He was a recipient of the Knight's Cross of the Iron Cross with Oak Leaves of Nazi Germany. He led the German bombers during the bombing of Wieluń, the first aerial bombing (and has been described as the first war crime) of the war. Sigel died on 8 May 1944 after crashing his aircraft into Trondheim Fjord.

Sigel was the commanding officer of Sturzkampfgeschwader 76 during the Junkers Ju 87 dive bombing demonstration at Neuhammer, present-day Świętoszów, Poland, on 15 August 1939. Observing the demonstration were the senior Luftwaffe commanders, including Generals Hugo Sperrle, Bruno Loerzer, and Wolfram von Richthofen. While Sigel managed to just barely pull out in time, 13 other Ju 87 crews crashed to their death. The event became known as the "Neuhammer Stuka Disaster" (Neuhammer Stuka-Unglück).

Awards and decorations
 Flugzeugführerabzeichen
 Front Flying Clasp of the Luftwaffe
 Iron Cross (1939)
 2nd Class (17 September 1939)
 1st Class (20 June 1940)
 German Cross in Gold on 24 April 1942 as Major in the I./Sturzkampfgeschwader 3
 Knight's Cross of the Iron Cross with Oak Leaves
 Knight's Cross on 21 July 1940 as Hauptmann and Gruppenkommandeur of I./Sturzkampfgeschwader 3
 116th Oak Leaves on 2 September 1942 as Oberstleutnant and Geschwaderkommodore of Schlachtgeschwader 3

Notes

Citations

Bibliography

 
 
 
 
 
 

1906 births
1944 deaths
Military personnel from Ulm
Luftwaffe pilots
German World War II pilots
Luftwaffe personnel killed in World War II
Recipients of the Gold German Cross
Recipients of the Knight's Cross of the Iron Cross with Oak Leaves
Victims of aviation accidents or incidents in Norway
People from the Kingdom of Württemberg